Betula populifolia (gray or grey birch) is a deciduous tree native to eastern North America.

Range
It ranges from southeastern Ontario east to Nova Scotia, and south to Pennsylvania and New Jersey, with disjunct populations in Indiana, Virginia, and North Carolina.  It prefers poor, dry upland soils, but is also found in moist mixed woodlands. Living only about 30 years, it is a common pioneer species on abandoned fields and burned areas. It is possibly extirpated in Delaware.

Characteristics
The tree often has multiple trunks branching off an old stump. The leaves are 2 to 2.7 inches (5-7 cm) long by 1.6 to 2.4 inches (4-6 cm) wide, alternately arranged, ovate, and tapering to an elongated tip. They are dark green and glabrous above and paler below, with a coarsely serrated margin. The bark is chalky to grayish white with black triangular patches where branch meets trunk. It is most easily confused for the paper birch (Betula papyrifera) by means of its bark; it is smooth and thin but does not readily exfoliate like paper birch does. The flowers are wind-pollinated catkins 5–8 cm long, the male catkins pendulous and the female catkins erect. The fruit, maturing in autumn, is composed of many tiny winged seeds packed between the catkin bracts.

The wood is medium hard and is used for high grade plywood, furniture, drum shells, spools and firewood.

Like other North American birches, gray birch is highly resistant to the bronze birch borer (Agrilus anxius). The leaves of the gray birch serve as food for various Lepidoptera, such as the leaf miner moth Cameraria betulivora. Between about 1930 and 1950, many gray birch trees, along with paper birch and yellow birch (Betula alleghaniensis), were affected and killed by  birch dieback disease.

Gray birch has been commonly planted as a landscaping tree in southern Pennsylvania and New Jersey as it tolerates heat and humidity better than paper birch and is more resistant to bronze birch borers and leaf miners.

Gallery

References

External links

 University of Connecticut Plant Database
 University of Florida Environmental Horticulture
 Flora of North America, profile and map: B. populifolia
 VT Dendrology

populifolia
Trees of the United States
Trees of Canada
Trees of Eastern Canada
Trees of the Northeastern United States
Trees of the North-Central United States
Flora of Massachusetts
Trees of humid continental climate
Trees of Ontario
Trees of the Southeastern United States
Flora of North America
Trees of the Great Lakes region (North America)